Cameraria nemoris is a moth of the family Gracillariidae. It is known from British Columbia in Canada, and California and Maine in the United States.

The wingspan is about 8 mm.

The larvae feed on Vaccinium ovatum. They mine the leaves of their host plant. The mine has the form of a blotch mine on the upperside of the leaf.

References

External links
mothphotographersgroup

Cameraria (moth)
Moths described in 1889

Leaf miners
Moths of North America
Lepidoptera of the United States
Lepidoptera of Canada
Taxa named by Thomas de Grey, 6th Baron Walsingham